The 1918 Wisconsin gubernatorial election was held on November 5, 1918.

Incumbent Republican Governor Emanuel L. Philipp won the election with 46.99% of the vote, winning his third and last term as governor. Philipp defeated Democratic Party candidate Henry A. Moehlenpah and Socialist candidate Emil Seidel.

Primary elections
Primary elections were held on September 3, 1918.

Democratic primary

Candidates
Henry A. Moehlenpah, Democratic nominee for Wisconsin's 1st congressional district in 1908

Results

Republican primary

Candidates
Emanuel L. Philipp, incumbent Governor
James N. Tittemore, president of the Wisconsin Society of Equity
Roy P. Wilcox, incumbent State Senator

Results

Socialist primary

Candidates
Emil Seidel, former Mayor of Milwaukee

Results

Prohibition primary

Candidates
Anthony J. Benjamin, Prohibition nominee for U.S. Senate in 1918 special election
William C. Dean, Prohibition nominee for Secretary of State of Wisconsin in 1910, Socialist candidate for the Wisconsin State Senate in 1916

Results

General election

Candidates
Major party candidates
Emanuel L. Philipp, Republican
Henry A. Moehlenpah, Democratic

Other candidates
William C. Dean, Prohibition
Emil Seidel, Socialist

Results

References

Bibliography
 
 
 

1918
Wisconsin
Gubernatorial
November 1918 events